Two warships of Japan have been named Yoshino:

 , a cruiser launched in 1892 and sunk in 1904
 , a  launched in 1974 and stricken in 2001

Japanese Navy ship names